Pachydiscus is an extinct genus of ammonite from the Late Cretaceous and Early Paleocene with a worldwide distribution, and type for the desmoceratacean family Pachydiscidae. The genus' type species is P. neubergicus. Altogether some 28 species have been described.

The shell of Pachydiscus is compressed and high-whorled, with an oval or flat sided section. Ribs tend to be differentiated into short umbilical and separate ventro-lateral sets, with a smooth area between. Some Hungarian specimens of this genus reached  in diameter.

Pachydiscus includes two subgenera, P. (Pachysiscus) from the Campanian in which the ribs persist, and P. (Neodesmoceras) from the Maastrichtian in which ribs disappear early, leaving an almost smooth shell.

Biostratigraphic significance 
The International Commission on Stratigraphy (ICS) has assigned the First Appearance Datum of Pachydiscus neubergicus as the defining biological marker for the start of the Maastrichtian Stage of the Cretaceous, 72.1 ± 0.2 million years ago.

Distribution 
Fossils of Pachydiscus have been found in Antarctica, Australia, Austria, Belgium, Brazil, Canada (British Columbia), Chile, Denmark, France, Germany, Haiti, India, Iran, Japan, Mexico, the Netherlands, New Zealand, Nigeria, Oman, Romania, the Russian Federation, Poland, Saudi Arabia, South Africa, Spain, Turkey, Ukraine, the United Arab Emirates, and the United States (Alaska, Arkansas, California, Delaware, Mississippi, New Jersey, Oregon, Texas, Washington).

References

Further reading 
 Treatise on Invertebrate Paleontology, Part L, Ammonoidea. R.C. Moore, ed. Geological Soc. of America and Univ. Kansas press. p L377-L380.
 A Pictorial Guide to Fossils by Gerard Ramon Case
 Cephalopods Present and Past: New Insights and Fresh Perspectives by Neil H. Landman, Richard Arnold Davis, and Royal H. Mapes
 Kennedy, W. J. (1986). Campanian and Maastrichtian Ammonites from Northern Aquitaine, France (No. 36). Palaeontological association. page 30

Desmoceratoidea
Ammonitida genera
Campanian life
Maastrichtian life
Campanian genus first appearances
Maastrichtian genus extinctions
Cretaceous ammonites
Index fossils
Ammonites of Africa
Cretaceous Africa
Ammonites of Asia
Cretaceous Asia
Ammonites of Australia
Cretaceous animals of Australia
Late Cretaceous ammonites of Europe
Cretaceous Europe
Late Cretaceous ammonites of North America
Cretaceous Canada
Cretaceous Mexico
Cretaceous United States
Ammonites of South America
Cretaceous Brazil
Cretaceous Chile
Cretaceous Caribbean